There are several places named Kilsyth:

Kilsyth, Scotland
Kilsyth, a suburb of Melbourne, Victoria, Australia
Electoral district of Kilsyth, a former electoral district in Victoria, Australia
Kilsyth, Ontario in Canada
There are also 2 towns named Kilsyth in the United States.
Kilsyth, West Virginia
Kilsyth, Tennessee